Humphrey is both a masculine given name and a surname. An earlier form, not attested since Medieval times, was Hunfrid. 

Notable people with the name include:

People with the given name

Medieval period
Ordered chronologically
Hunfrid of Prüm (Saint Humphrey, died 871), Benedictine monk
Humphrey of Hauteville (c. 1010–1057), Count of Apulia
Humphrey de Bohun (disambiguation), various people who lived from the 11th to 14th centuries
Humphrey of Toron (disambiguation), four 12th-century nobles
Humphrey, 2nd Earl of Buckingham (1381–1399), English peer and member of the House of Lords
Humphrey, Duke of Gloucester (1390–1447)

Modern era
Humphrey Atkins (1922–1996), British politician and a member of the Conservative Party
Humphrey Barclay (1941–), British television comedy producer.
Humphrey Bate (1875–1936), American harmonica player and string band leader
Humphrey Bland (1686–1763), British Army general
Humphrey Bogart (1899–1957), American film actor
Humphrey Carpenter (1946–2005), English biographer, writer, and radio broadcaster
Humphrey Critchley-Salmonson (1894–1956), cricketer
Humphrey Crum-Ewing (1802–1887), English Liberal politician who sat in the House of Commons from 1857 to 1874
Humphrey J. Desmond (1858–1932), American politician, writer, lawyer, and newspaper editor
Humphrey Gilbert (1539–1583), English adventurer, explorer, member of parliament and soldier
Humphrey Henchman (1592–1675), Church of England clergyman and bishop of London from 1663 to 1675
Humphrey Jennings (1907-1950), English filmmaker and co-founder of Mass-Observation
Humphrey Lyttelton (1921–2008), British jazz musician and host of I'm Sorry I Haven't a Clue
Humphrey Mitchell (1894–1950), Canadian politician and trade unionist
Humphrey Moseley (died 1661), prominent London publisher and bookseller in the middle seventeenth century
Humphrey Mwanza (1949–2015), Zambian politician
Humphrey Owen (1702–1768), Principal of Jesus College, Oxford
Humphrey Park (1981-), web SDK developer of Kakao
Humphrey Rudge (1977-), Dutch Footballer
Humphrey Searle (1915–1982), English composer
Humphrey Wells, former Governor of Georgia
Humphrey Wingfield (died 1545), English lawyer, Speaker of the House of Commons of England between 1533 and 1536

People with the surname

Arts and entertainment
Bobbi Humphrey (born 1950), American jazz flautist and singer
Doris Humphrey (1895–1958), dancer
Earl Humphrey (1902–1971), American jazz trombonist, brother of Willie and Percy
Jake Humphrey (born 1978), television presenter
Maud Humphrey (1868–1940), American illustrator
Nene Humphrey (born 1947), American artist
Ozias Humphrey or Humphry (1742–1810), English painter
Percy Humphrey (1905–1995), American jazz trumpeter, brother of Earl and Willie
Renee Humphrey (born 1975), American actress
Scott Humphrey, Canadian record producer and mix engineer
Willie Humphrey (1900–1994), American jazz clarinetist, brother of Earl and Percy

Politics
Benjamin G. Humphreys (1808–1882), governor of Mississippi 
Benjamin G. Humphreys II (1865-1923),  U.S. Representative from Mississippi
Charles Humphrey (1792–1850), American lawyer and politician
Friend Humphrey (1787–1854), New York politician
Gordon J. Humphrey (born 1940), U.S. senator from New Hampshire
Hubert Humphrey (1911–1978), Vice President of the United States
Jasper Humphrey (1812–1892), American sailor and politician
Lester H. Humphrey (1850–1902), New York state senator
Muriel Humphrey (1912–1998), U.S. senator from Minnesota and wife of Hubert Humphrey
Philander P. Humphrey (1823–1862), American politician and physician
Skip Humphrey (Hubert H. Humphrey III, born 1942), son of Hubert H. Humphrey II
William E. Humphrey (1862–1934), American politician
Wolcott J. Humphrey (1817–1890), New York state senator

Sports
Chris Humphrey (born 1987), footballer
Claude Humphrey (1944-2021), American former football defensive lineman
Creed Humphrey (born 1999), American football player
Lil'Jordan Humphrey (born 1998), American football player
Marlon Humphrey (born 1996), American football player
Ryan Humphrey (born 1979), American basketball player
Tasha Humphrey (born 1985), professional basketball player
Terin Humphrey (born 1986), American gymnast
Tory Humphrey (born 1983), American football player

Science and academics
Heman Humphrey (1779–1861), President of Amherst College
James Ellis Humphrey (1861-1897), American botanist and mycologist with the botanical author abbreviation Humphrey
John H. Humphrey (1915-1987), bacteriologist and immunologist
Nicholas Humphrey (born 1943), British psychologist
Philip Strong Humphrey (1926–2009), American ornithologist
Thomas M. Humphrey (born 1935), American economist

Other fields
Alexander Pope Humphrey (1848–1928), American lawyer, judge of chancery court
Andrew Humphrey (1921–1977), Marshal of the Royal Air Force
Edward Porter Humphrey (1809–1886), American Presbyterian minister, author, Presbyterian General Assembly moderator
Edward William Cornelius Humphrey (1844–1917), American theological and legal scholar
Hannah Humphrey (active 1745–1818), British publisher and print seller
John Peters Humphrey (1905–1995), Canadian jurist
Lewis Craig Humphrey (1875–1927), American newspaper editor
Mose Humphrey, American  and member of Fire Company 40
Watts Humphrey (1927–2010), American software engineer

Fictional characters
Sir Humphrey Appleby, on the BBC television show Yes Minister
 Sir Humphrey Pengallan, main antagonist of the film Jamaica Inn
 Sir Humphrey Pumphrey, antagonist in Rupert
Dalton Humphrey, on The Red Green Show
Dan Humphrey, Gossip Girl character
 Humphrey Chimpden Earwicker, in James Joyce's novel Finnegans Wake
Humphrey B. Bear, an Australian children's TV character
Humphrey the Bear, a Disney character
Humphrey, a muppet on Sesame Street
Jenny Humphrey, Gossip Girl character
Rufus Humphrey, Gossip Girl character
Humphrey, OMORI character

See also
Humfrey, given name and surname
Humphery, surname
Humphry, surname
Humphreys (surname)
Humphries, surname
Humphrys, surname

English-language masculine given names
English masculine given names
English-language surnames
Surnames of Norman origin

de:Humphrey